In Greek mythology, Euarne or Evarne (Ancient Greek: Εὐάρνη Euarnê) was the "lovely of shape and without blemish of form" Nereid of marble rocks. She was the sea-nymph daughter of the 'Old Man of the Sea' Nereus and the Oceanid Doris.

Notes

References 

 Hesiod, Theogony from The Homeric Hymns and Homerica with an English Translation by Hugh G. Evelyn-White, Cambridge, MA.,Harvard University Press; London, William Heinemann Ltd. 1914. Online version at the Perseus Digital Library. Greek text available from the same website.
 Kerényi, Carl, The Gods of the Greeks, Thames and Hudson, London, 1951.

Nereids